The 1984 Giro d'Italia was the 67th edition of the Giro d'Italia, one of cycling's Grand Tours. The Giro began in Lucca, with a prologue individual time trial on 17 May, and Stage 12 occurred on 30 May with a stage from Rieti. The race finished in Verona on 10 June.

Stage 12
30 May 1984 — Rieti to Città di Castello,

Stage 13
31 May 1984 — Città di Castello to Lerici,

Stage 14
1 June 1984 — Lerici to Alessandria,

Stage 15
2 June 1984 — Certosa di Pavia to Milan,  (ITT)

Rest day 2
3 June 1984

Stage 16
4 June 1984 — Alessandria to Bardonecchia,

Stage 17
5 June 1984 — Bardonecchia to Lecco,

Stage 18
6 June 1984 — Lecco to Merano,

Stage 19
7 June 1984 — Merano to Selva di Val Gardena,

Stage 20
8 June 1984 — Selva di Val Gardena to Arabba,

Stage 21
9 June 1984 — Arabba to Treviso,

Stage 22
10 June 1984 — Soave to Verona,  (ITT)

References

1984 Giro d'Italia
Giro d'Italia stages